Leonid Volkov may refer to:

 Leonid Volkov (ice hockey) (1934-1995), Russian ice hockey player
 Leonid Volkov (politician) (born 1980), Russian politician
 Leonid Volkov (skydiver) (born 1988), Russian skydiver